Lee Hong Lim (born 29 September 1983) is a Hong Kong professional footballer who currently plays as a left winger for Hong Kong Premier League club Lee Man. 

He is the brother of former professional footballer Lee Wai Lim.

Early age
Lee Hong Lim and his brother, Lee Wai Lim grew up in Hong Kong Sha Tau Kok. They were discovered and recruited by Chan Ping, the team manager of Tai Po, who was impressed by the brothers in a street match.

Club career

Tai Po
Tai Po was in the Third Division when the brothers joined the team. The team were promoted to division two and brothers were crucial members of the promoted team, for which Lee Hong Lim scored 12 goals in 22 games. The team finished at the second spot at 2005–06 season and secured promotion from Second division to First division. Lee Hong Lim decided to quit his full-time job and became a full-time professional football player. He wore no. 7 shirt in 2006–07 season and had 2 goals in 21 games. Tai Po finished at the 7th spot in their debut 1st division season.

Pegasus
Lee Hon Lim moved to Pegasus in the January 2009 transfer window. He has since scored an important goal in the League Cup semifinal against South China which ended 2:1 in Pegasus' favour.

South China
On 9 July 2012, South China chairman Steven Lo announced that they have signed Lee Hong Lim for the 2012–13 season. He made his debut for South China on 2 September 2012 at Hong Kong Stadium, having scored a long-range goal to help the team win against Yokohama FC Hong Kong 5–2.

Lee Man
On 19 July 2019, Lee Man announced the signing of Lee at their season opening media event.

International career

Hong Kong
At the 2011 Long Teng Cup, in the final match against Chinese Taipei, Lee Hong Lim scored two goals and helped Hong Kong win the match 6–0 and retain the trophy.

Career statistics

Club
 As of 4 May 2013

Remarks:1 Since Tai Po was in the Second Division in the 2005–06 season, they could only participate in Junior Challenge Shield but not Senior Challenge Shield.

International

Honours
Pegasus
 Hong Kong FA Cup: 2009–10

South China
 Hong Kong First Division: 2012–13
 Hong Kong Senior Shield: 2013–14

Eastern
 Hong Kong Premier League: 2015–16
 Hong Kong Senior Shield: 2015–16

References

External links
 
 

1983 births
Living people
Hong Kong footballers
Association football defenders
Hong Kong First Division League players
Hong Kong Premier League players
Tai Po FC players
TSW Pegasus FC players
South China AA players
Eastern Sports Club footballers
Lee Man FC players
Hong Kong international footballers
Hong Kong people of Hakka descent
Indigenous inhabitants of the New Territories in Hong Kong